Rodonas (before 1926: Γκιούλεντς - Gkioulents) is a village in Florina Regional Unit, Macedonia, Greece.

The Greek census (1920) recorded 129 people in the village and in 1923 there were 1123 inhabitants (or 33 families) who were Muslim. Following the Greek-Turkish population exchange, in 1926 within Gkioulents there were 28 refugee families from the Caucasus. The Greek census (1928) recorded 110 village inhabitants. There were 28 refugee families (91 people) in 1928. In the early years after their arrival, the refugees used the village mosque as a school, later it was abandoned (and in the modern period no longer exists) when a new school building was constructed.

References 

Populated places in Florina (regional unit)

Amyntaio